Oceanisphaera marina is a Gram-negative, strictly aerobic, rod-shaped and motile bacterium from the genus of Oceanisphaera which has been isolated from a seamount from the western Pacific.

References 

Aeromonadales
Bacteria described in 2017